These are the official results of the Women's 100 metres event at the 2005 IAAF World Championships in Helsinki, Finland. The final was held on August 8.

Medalists

Records

Results

Heats
7 August 2005 (14:45)

Quarterfinals
7 August 2005 (18:40)

Semifinals
8 August 2005 (18:50)

Final
8 August 2005 (21:35)

External links
Official results - IAAF.org

100 metres
100 metres at the World Athletics Championships
2005 in women's athletics